Fighting Instinct was a Christian rock band formed in Winston-Salem/Greensboro, North Carolina. It was founded by TJ Harris and Dallas Farmer. They played together for several years before they met up with Jason Weekly in the Winston-Salem/Greensboro area. Jason Weekly came up with the band's name.

They released their first CD, Fighting Instinct, in mid-2006. The first single off this album, "I Found Forever," was featured on both rock and Christian radio stations. "I Found Forever" rose to No. 31 on the active rock charts with virtually no touring. The band's Christian single, "Back to You", reached No. 5 on the Christian CHR charts. "Back to You" and "Just to Please You" were only released to Christian radio stations. In October 2008, the band announced on their MySpace that they were releasing a five-song EP, but also announced they were going to disband at the end of the year.

Their Lead Vocalist, TJ Harris, joined the band Decyfer Down in 2008.

Later, in 2016, Harris reported in an interview that he left Fighting Instinct because Decyfer Down had asked him to join them.

Music history 
The group were called "One to Watch" by CCM Magazine. They have a mutual appreciation of the band Led Zeppelin.

They released, Fighting Instinct, on July 27, 2006, with Gotee Records. Their first studio album, Fighting Instinct, was reviewed in AllMusic, CCM Magazine, Christian Broadcasting Network, Christianity Today, Cross Rhythms, HM Magazine, Jesus Freak Hideout, New Release Today, and The Phantom Tollbooth. The song, "I Found Forever", charted on two Billboard magazine charts.

Discography

Albums

EPs

Compilations

Singles

Members 

 Original lineup
 TJ Harris - vocals and guitar
 Jason Weekly - bass guitar
 Dallas Farmer - drums

 Second lineup
 TJ Harris - lead vocals and rhythm guitar
 Jason Weekly - bass guitar
 Derek Dyre - lead guitar and backing vocals
 Chris Burrow - drums

References 

American Christian rock groups
Musical groups established in 2004
Musical groups disestablished in 2008
Musical groups from North Carolina
Gotee Records artists